Mordellochroa abdominalis is a beetle in the genus Mordellochroa of the family Mordellidae. It was described in 1775 by Johan Christian Fabricius.

References

Mordellidae
Beetles described in 1775
Taxa named by Johan Christian Fabricius